Del Monte Heights (Del Monte, Spanish for "Of The Mountain") is a neighborhood of Seaside in Monterey County, California. It was formerly an unincorporated community.

Del Monte Heights was laid out in 1909 by F.M. Hilby and George W. Phelps.

References

Neighborhoods in Monterey County, California

Populated places established in 1909
1909 establishments in California